The Immanuel Chapel Protestant Episcopal Church in Louisville, Kentucky, which has also been known as Emmanuel Episcopal Church, is a historic church at 410 Fairmont Avenue.  It was built in 1909 and added to the National Register of Historic Places in 1983.

It has lancet windows down its sides.  By 1983, a new church had been built next door and this building was no longer used for church services, but it was used for other purposes by the congregation.

References

Episcopal church buildings in Kentucky
Churches on the National Register of Historic Places in Kentucky
Gothic Revival church buildings in Kentucky
Churches completed in 1909
Churches in Louisville, Kentucky
National Register of Historic Places in Louisville, Kentucky
1909 establishments in Kentucky